Murray Davey Tyrrell AM (10 February 19212 October 2000) was an Australian winemaker.

He was prominent in the development of the wine industry in the Hunter Valley of New South Wales, and for many years was regarded as the leading promoter and spokesperson for the wine industry there.

In the 1986 Australia Day Honours, he was appointed a Member of the Order of Australia (AM) for "service to the wine industry and to tourism".

He served in armed force during WWII  and then later worked as cattleman. In 1959 he took over  the Tyrell's family winery.

References

Further reading

https://catalogue.nla.gov.au/Record/734664 an interview with Murray Tyrrell by Mel Platt 

1921 births
2000 deaths
Members of the Order of Australia
Australian winemakers
People from the Hunter Region